Henry Rufus Pierson (June 13, 1819 – January 1, 1890) was an American lawyer and politician from New York.

Life
He graduated from Union College in 1846. Then he studied law, first in Cherry Valley, then in New York City, was admitted to the bar in 1848, and practiced. In 1849, he moved to Brooklyn. He was an Alderman (3rd Ward) of Brooklyn from 1858 to 1860, and was President of the Board of Aldermen. He was President of the Brooklyn City Railroad from 1860 to 1869.

He was a member of the New York State Senate (2nd D.) in 1866 and 1867. In 1869, he went to Chicago as Financial Agent of the North Western Railroad, and was the company's vice president for two years.

In 1872, he moved to Albany, and was a member of the New York State Assembly (Albany Co., 2nd D.) in 1873. He was elected a Regent of the University of the State of New York, and was Vice Chancellor from 1878 to 1881, and Chancellor from 1881 until his death.

He died from the Russian flu at his home in Albany, and was buried at the Green-Wood Cemetery in Brooklyn.

References

Sources
 The New York Civil List compiled by Franklin Benjamin Hough, Stephen C. Hutchins and Edgar Albert Werner (1870; pg. 444)
 Life Sketches of the State Officers, Senators, and Members of the Assembly of the State of New York, in 1867 by S. R. Harlow & H. H. Boone (pg. 135ff)

External links

1819 births
1890 deaths
Republican Party New York (state) state senators
People from Montgomery County, New York
People from Brooklyn
Union College (New York) alumni
19th-century American railroad executives
Regents of the University of the State of New York
Burials at Green-Wood Cemetery
Republican Party members of the New York State Assembly
Deaths from the 1889–1890 flu pandemic
19th-century American politicians